Cape Town Tigers is a South African basketball club based in Gauteng. The team is located in the Johannesburg suburb of Sandton. Established in 2019 by three American business partners, the club has won the South African national championship in 2021 and 2022. 

The Tigers currently play internationally in the Basketball Africa League (BAL), besides competing domestically in the South African National Basketball Championship.

History
The team was founded in 2019 by the organisation Severus LLC, founded by American business partners Chante Butler, Raphael Edwards. Dia Martin, and William McFarlan. The Severus company was established in order to develop a professional basketball team that could play in the Basketball Africa League (BAL) within 5 years.

Its first roster featured two former NBA players in Billy Preston and Ben Uzoh. Several players for the South African national team were also on the team, such as Pieter Prinsloo, Christopher Gabriel, Thabo Sithole and Lehlogonolo Tholo.

In September 2021, the Tigers won their first national championship. The team beat Jozi Nuggets after overtime in the final, behind Ben Uzoh who scored 22 points in the championship game. Later in the year, the team competed in the qualification games of the BAL for the first time. The team finished as third without playing its last game which was forfeited by opponent New Star after players tested positive for COVID-19.

On August 22, 2022, the Tigers successfully defended their national title. Three months later, on November 26, the Tigers clinched their second consecutive BAL spot after beating City Oilers in the Road to BAL semi-finals.

In January 2023, Nigerian singer Mr Eazi purchased shares of the organisation.

Honours
South African National Championship
Champions (2): 2021, 2022

Basketball Africa League
Quarterfinalist (1): 2022

Players

Current roster
As of 27 February 2023.

 

Head coach:  Rasheed Hazzard

Notable players

Head coaches 
Thus far, the Tigers have had three head coaches:
  Raphael Edwards: (2021)
  Relton Booysen: (2021–2022)
  Florsheim Ngwenya: (2022)
  Rasheed Hazzard: (2023–present)

References

External links
Official website
Official Twitter

Basketball Africa League teams
Basketball teams in South Africa
Basketball teams established in 2019
Sport in Cape Town
2019 establishments in South Africa
Road to BAL teams